Mary Fisher Bookshop was a bookshop and publisher in Launceston in Tasmania.  It was situated at 14 The Quadrant, Launceston (off St John Street). It was of the same era and style of Fullers Bookshop in Hobart. Some of the books published in the 1970s were specifically of items about history of Western Tasmania.

Selected items relating to or including material about Western Tasmania

Notes

Launceston, Tasmania
Bookshops of Australia
Retail buildings in Tasmania